Rhodes Icefall is an icefall draining west out of McDonald Heights through a breach in the middle of Peden Cliffs. The icefall nourishes the Garfield Glacier near the coast of Marie Byrd Land. Mapped by United States Geological Survey (USGS) from surveys and U.S. Navy air photos, 1959–65. Named by Advisory Committee on Antarctic Names (US-ACAN) for William L. Rhodes, ABH1, U.S. Navy, Aviation Boatswain's Mate, crash crew leader at Williams Field, McMurdo Sound, during Operation Deep Freeze 1968, 1969 and 1970.
 

Icefalls of Antarctica
Bodies of ice of Marie Byrd Land